TAU Ventures is a venture capital firm investing in early state startups in Israel. It was founded in 2018 by Tel Aviv University and Nimrod Cohen, and is headquartered in Tel Aviv, Israel.

History 
In early 2018, Tel Aviv University announced the creation of TAU Ventures, an early-stage venture capital fund with US$20 million. Its operational period is a seven-year cycle, tentatively. It is a first of its kind concept in Israel, modelled after similar funds existing in other universities such as Stanford University, the University of California, Berkeley, and Massachusetts Institute of Technology (MIT). Nimrod Cohen is the managing partner.

Investments 
TAU Ventures invests an initial capital of US$500,000 with potential follow-up investments into early stage startups of Israel belonging to various industries such as enterprise solutions, fintech, industry 4.0, and food technology, with a majority being software related.

The TAU Ventures ecosystem combines the resources and global network of Tel Aviv University, strong industry connections, and an expansive network of Israeli startup founders. It operates at its 1000 square meter co-working office space located in Tel Aviv. The space consists of in-house experts who mentor and support the portfolio of companies in various aspects of startup growth.

As of May 2021, TAU Ventures has invested in 17 startups. Xtend, SWIMM, Gaviti, MyAir, Medorion, Castor, and Hoopo are some of its notable companies.

Program 
Along with its venture capital operations, TAU Ventures operates an accelerator program in partnership with the Israeli Security Agency (ISA) which provides a technological platform for founders. It is a four-month exclusive program that connects startups with the ISA and a US$50,000 grant with no equity clause. The program is geared to companies developing civilian and commercial technologies and can benefit from various technical expertise, unique databases, technology validation, and other factors. The alumni startups have raised over US$100 million. Xtend, Cyberpion, Talamoos, Cyabra, DigitalOwl, Decodea, and NeuraLegion  are some of its alumni.

Recognition 
In 2018, IVC Research Center awarded TAU Ventures the citation for being the most active venture capital in Israel. In 2019 and 2021, Geektime listed TAU Ventures among the top five and top six of venture capital funds in Israel.

References 

Startup accelerators
Tel Aviv University
Israeli companies established in 2018
2018 establishments in Israel